The 1958 All-SEC football team consists of American football players selected to the All-Southeastern Conference (SEC) chosen by various selectors for the 1958 NCAA University Division football season. LSU won the conference.

All-SEC selections

Ends
Jerry Wilson, Auburn (AP, UPI-1)
Don Fleming, Florida (AP, UPI-1)
Larry Grantham, Ole Miss (UPI-2)
Billy Hendrix, LSU (UPI-2)

Tackles
Vel Heckman, Florida (AP, UPI-1)
Cleve Wester, Auburn (AP, UPI-1)
Nat Dye, Georgia (UPI-2)
Dave Sington, Alabama (UPI-2)

Guards
George Deiderich, Vanderbilt (AP, UPI-1)
Zeke Smith, Auburn (AP, UPI-1)
Jack Benson, Miss. St. (UPI-2)
Bobby Urano, Tennessee (UPI-2)

Centers
Jackie Burkett, Auburn (AP, UPI-2)
Max Fugler, LSU (UPI-1)

Quarterbacks
Warren Rabb, LSU (AP)
Rich Petitbon, Tulane (UPI-1)
Billy Stacy, Miss. St. (UPI-2)
Bob Franklin, Ole Miss (UPI-2)

Halfbacks
Billy Cannon, LSU (College Football Hall of Fame) (AP, UPI-1)
Johnny Robinson, LSU (AP)
Tom Moore, Vanderbilt (UPI-1)
Bobby Cravens, Kentucky (UPI-2)

Fullbacks
Charlie Flowers, Ole Miss (College Football Hall of Fame) (AP, UPI-2)
Theron Sapp, Georgia (UPI-1)

Key

AP = Associated Press.

UPI = United Press International

Bold = Consensus first-team selection by both AP and UPI

See also
1958 College Football All-America Team

References

All-SEC
All-SEC football teams